Patrick Facchini (born 28 January 1988 in Trento) is an Italian former road bicycle racer, and current mountain runner. He turned professional for the 2013 season, joining UCI Professional Continental team .

Anti-doping rule violation
Facchini tested positive for Tuaminoheptane at the Tour of Belgium on 30 May 2014 and was subsequently handed a 10-month ban from sports by UCI.

Palmarès

2009
1st Trofeo Rosalpina
Baby Giro
 1st Stage 1
4th Cronoscalata Gardone Val Trompia-Prati di Caregno
5th GP Palio del Recioto
2010
5th Trofeo Franco Balestra
7th Trofeo Zssdi
2011
1st Memorial Gerry Gasparotto
2nd Trofeo Gianfranco Bianchin
8th Overall Giro del Friuli
8th GP Capodarco
8th Ruota d'Oro
2012
1st Trofeo Rigoberto Lamonica
1st Memorial Pigoni Coli
1st Cronoscalata Cornino-Monte Prat
1st Freccia dei Vini-Memorial Dottor Luigi Raffele
1st Cronoscalata Gardone Val Trompia-Prati di Caregno
1st Trofeo Franco Balestra
1st Trofeo Zssdi
5th Overall Giro delle Valli Cuneesi nelle Alpi del mare
1st Stage 2 
8th Piccolo Giro di Lombardia
10th Ruota d'Oro

National titles
Italian Vertical Kilometer Championships
Vertical kilometer: 2017

References

External links

Italian male cyclists
1988 births
Living people
Sportspeople from Trento
Doping cases in cycling
Italian sportspeople in doping cases
Italian male mountain runners
Italian sky runners
Cyclists from Trentino-Alto Adige/Südtirol
21st-century Italian people